The Death of Nightlife is the second album by British indie/art rock band Help She Can't Swim, released in May 2007 on Fantastic Plastic Records. The album is available on 12" vinyl, CD and download formats. The vinyl album includes an extra track, "Why Don't We Just Hurt Ourselves", which is placed between "All the Stars" and "Just Be Social". The CD version came with a bonus disc containing the four track Committing Social Suicide EP, previously unavailable on CD.

Track listing
"Pass the Hat Around" – 3:36
"Idle Chatter" – 2:47
"Kite Eating Tree" – 1:54
"Hospital Drama" – 3:09
"Apes and Pigs at the Vulture Coliseum" – 3:14
"I Think the Record's Stopped" – 2:53
"Midnight Garden" – 2:26
"Box of Delights" – 2:42
"All the Stars" – 3:08
"Why Don't We Just Hurt Ourselves" (vinyl only)
"Just Be Social" – 2:49
"Dragged Under A Wave" – 2:16
"Never the Right Time for Us" – 4:26

Personnel 
Tom Denney – vocals, guitar, keyboard
Leesey Frances – keyboard, vocals
Tom Baker – bass guitar, keyboard
Lewis Baker – drums

References

2007 albums
Help She Can't Swim albums
Fantastic Plastic Records albums